Comasagua is a municipality in the La Libertad department of El Salvador.

During the January 2001 El Salvador earthquake, a landslide wiped out the only road leading to Comasagua, constraining relief efforts. The town was also at the center of destruction during the 1982 El Salvador earthquake.

Gallery

Notes

Municipalities of the La Libertad Department (El Salvador)